The Singapore Prestige Brand Award is an annual award conferred to recognise outstanding efforts of Small and Medium-sized Enterprises in Singapore in the promotion of their brands. First given out in 2002 through a collaboration between the Association of Small and Medium Enterprises (ASME) and the Lianhe Zaobao, it has since recognised close to 100 local brandnames of SMEs, and introduced a new Heritage Brand Award category for its 2005 edition.

Judging criteria
A point system is used to access entries over five broad criteria, broken down as follows:

 Brand strategy / identity
 Brand culture
 Integrated brand communications
 Brand equity
 Brand performance

External links
Singapore Prestige Brand Award homepage

Economy of Singapore